This table shows record weather extremes in Canada.

*A snowfall season is the amount of snow that falls between July 1 and June 30, spanning over the winter period.

Provincial extremes

See also

List of extreme temperatures in Canada
Temperature in Canada
List of weather records

References

External links
 map of Temperature Ranges (in Fahrenheit)

Weather events in Canada